"Northcote (So Hungover)" is a song by Australian musical comedian The Bedroom Philosopher released in February 2010 and is taken from the ARIA-nominated album Songs from the 86 Tram. It was a notable radio hit on national broadcaster Triple J and its film clip, directed by Craig Melville and produced by David Curry, received over 500,000 views on YouTube.

The song featured in the following year's Triple J Hottest 100 and charted at 12 on the Australian independent charts.

Personnel  
 Justin Heazlewood – vocals and acoustic guitar
 Andy Hazel – bass and backing vocals
 Gordon Blake – electric guitar and backing vocals
 Hugh Rabinovici – drums

Awards 
Australian Directors Guild Award - Best Music Video 
Australian Cinematographers Society Award - Best Cinematography in a Music Video - Silver 
California International Film Festival - Best Music Video 
St Kilda Film Festival - Best Independent Music Video 
Best Music Video Award at the 2010 Royal Flush Festival

References

The Bedroom Philosopher songs
2010 songs
Comedy rock songs

2010 singles